LaGaylia Frazier (born 16 February 1961) is an American-born Swedish singer who specializes in Soul  and jazz.

Early life and work
LaGaylia Frazier was born in Miami, Florida. and grew up in Miami Shores. As a child she played classical piano for twelve years. She began singing at the age of 15 and received a full scholarship at the University of Miami where she majored in voice and musical theatre.

After leaving the University of Miami, she performed with Top 40 bands, eventually joining singer Rosco Martinez and pianist Paquito Hechavarriais in a Pop-Latin dance band whose recording debut was as Bandera in 1989. Bandera enjoyed radio support in Florida but were otherwise overlooked despite a European promotional tour by Frazier and her bandmates. After a sabbatical in Britain, Frazier returned to Florida in 1990 and was hired to sing with the house band at the Fort Lauderdale club Coconuts. After she was noticed by a manager, Eliot Weisman, she began singing in Atlantic City and Las Vegas.

Frazier sang backup on the song "I Can't Wait Another Minute" (R&B #1, Pop #8) by Hi-Five and on the title song from the album  Hold Me, Thrill Me, Kiss Me by Gloria Estefan. In 1994, with Emilio Estefan producing, she recorded the Jon Secada song "Shower Me With Your Love"  for the soundtrack to the film The Specialist.

Career in Sweden
While performing at Coconuts in 1999, Frazier was discovered by Marie Schröder, who was visiting the US and became her manager. Frazier went on tour in Scandinavia with the 2000 edition of Rhapsody in Rock by Robert Wells. She moved to Sweden in 2001 where she currently resides. She participated in Rhapsody of Rock tours in 2001, 2002, 2007 and 2011 editions.

Frazier made two bids to represent Sweden in the Eurovision Song Contest: at Melodifestivalen 2004 with "It's in the Stars"  and at Melodifestivalen 2005 with "Nothing at All".  Both were released by the Lionheart Records M&L label. In 2005, Frazier signed a three-single deal with Lionheart but subsequent to "Nothing at All", which reached No. 38 on the Swedish chart, she had only one single release, "Head in the Clouds" in April 2006. Her album  Uncovered was released in 2007 by her label TBG. She wrote nine of the album's ten songs with its producer, Marcus Dernulf.

In 2008, Frazier participated in the Romanian national pre-selection round for Eurovision known as Selecția Națională, performing the song "Dr Frankenstein". She won the Baltic Festival in Karlshamn with her song "Over and Over Again" in July 2008.

In 2003 Frazier performed as Anita in the Malmö Opera and Music Theatre's production of West Side Story. She repeated the role in Stockholm at Stadstheatre in 2015.  In 2004, and 2011 she appeared at the Stockholm Jazz Festival. Her 2011 performance in the Festival was joined by her father Hal Frazier. Since 2010 she has collaborated and toured with pianist Jan Lundgren and his trio, performing in the Ystad Jazz Festival again with her father Hal Frazier. At a concert with Lundgren's trio at the Jazz Museum in Strömsholm, she received the Anita O'Day Award in August 2010. Her second album, Until It's Time (2012), was a collaboration with Lundgren. She was also invited to sing at a tribute to Quincy Jones held in Ystad and attended by Quincy Jones himself.

Beginning in 2010, she toured in Sweden in an R&B revue entitled the Blues Mothers with Sahlene. She was a choirmaster in Season #2 of Körslaget (2008-09).

She is one of the jury in Talang 2017 , 2018, 2019, and 2020 which is broadcast on TV4.  She participated as a celebrity dancer in Let's Dance 2019, which is broadcast on TV4.

Discography

Albums

Singles

References

External links
Official site

1961 births
20th-century African-American women singers
American emigrants to Sweden
American soul singers
Living people
Musicians from Miami
21st-century Swedish women singers
Swedish people of African-American descent
University of Miami alumni
People from Miami Shores, Florida
Melodifestivalen contestants of 2005
Melodifestivalen contestants of 2004